Rubashkin is a rural locality (a khutor) in Gorbatovskoye Rural Settlement, Serafimovichsky District, Volgograd Oblast, Russia. The population was 140 as of 2010. There are 3 streets.

Geography 
Rubashkin is located near the Krivaya River, 63 km southwest of Serafimovich (the district's administrative centre) by road. Gorbatovsky is the nearest rural locality.

References 

Rural localities in Serafimovichsky District